WHMX (105.7 FM) is a radio station broadcasting a Contemporary Christian format. Licensed to Lincoln, Maine, United States, the station serves the Northern and Downeast Maine area. The station is currently owned by Lighthouse Radio Network, Inc.

History
The station went on the air as WLKN-FM on April 1, 1975.  On September 3, 1987, the station changed its call sign to WGUY, and on June 8, 1989, it became the current WHMX.  The station for much of the 1990s was known as Hot Mix 106 and in 1997 was bought out by Bangor Baptist church and paired with WHCF. In May 2005, the station changed slogans from 105-7 The X to Solution FM .

On September 28, 2012, the sale of WHMX and WHCF, along with translators W274AF, W221BO, W227BE, W229AT, and W270BD, to Lighthouse Radio Network, Inc. was consummated at a price of $100.

The station is heard on several broadcast translators:

Programming
Solution FM is a non-denominational, non-profit, listener-supporter radio network. They play a mix of songs from Christian CHR (Christian Hit Radio) and Christian Rock 24/7.

References

External links

Radio stations established in 1975
Lincoln, Maine
Contemporary Christian radio stations in the United States
HMX